D. polymorpha may refer to:

 Danaea polymorpha, a eusporangiate fern
 Dialeurodes polymorpha, an agricultural pest
 Diplodia polymorpha, an anamorphic fungus
 Discula polymorpha, a gastropod mollusk
 Ditaxis polymorpha, a false croton
 Dreissena polymorpha, a freshwater mussel
 Drosophila polymorpha, a small fly
 Dunaliella polymorpha, a green alga